The National Disaster Response Force (NDRF) is an Indian specialized force constituted "for the purpose of special response to a threatening disaster situation or disaster" under the Disaster Management Act, 2005.  The "Apex Body for Disaster Management" in India is the National Disaster Management Authority (NDMA). The Chairman of the NDMA is the Prime Minister.

The responsibility of managing disasters in India is that of the State Government. The ‘Nodal Ministry’ in the central government for management of natural disasters is the Ministry of Home Affairs (MHA).

When 'calamities of severe nature' occur, the Central Government is responsible for providing aid and assistance to the affected state, including deploying, at the State's request, of Armed Forces, Central Paramilitary Forces, National Disaster Response Force (NDRF), and such communication, air and other assets, as are available and needed.

National Disaster Response Force (NDRF) is under the National Disaster Management Authority. The head of the NDRF is designated as Director General. The Director Generals of NDRF are IPS officers on deputation from Indian police organizations. Director General is a three-star officer.

The NDRF is a top-heavy organization which in addition to the Director General has several Inspector Generals (IG) and Deputy IGs, who are flag officers and wear badges of rank.

Composition 
National Disaster Response Force (NDRF) is a force of 16 battalions, organized on para-military lines, and manned by persons on deputation from the para-military forces of India: three Border Security Force, three Central Reserve Police Force, two Central Industrial Security Force, two Indo-Tibetan Border Police, two Sashastra Seema Bal and one of the Assam Rifles. The total strength of each battalion is approximately 1149. Each battalion is capable of providing 18 self-contained specialist search and rescue teams of 45 personnel each including engineers, technicians, electricians, dog squads and medical/paramedics.

Deployment 

These NDRF battalions are located at twelve different locations in the country based on the vulnerability profile to cut down the response time for their deployment. During the preparedness period/in a threatening disaster situation, proactive deployment of these forces will be carried out by the NDMA in consultation with state authorities. The present location of NDRF Battalions are as follows:

Functional Parameters 
The aim of the National Disaster Management Authority is to build a safer and disaster resilient India by developing a holistic, proactive, multi-disaster and technology driven strategy for disaster management. This has to be achieved through a culture of prevention, mitigation and preparedness to generate a prompt and efficient response at the time of disasters. This national vision inter alia, aims at inculcating a culture of preparedness among all stakeholders.

NDRF has proved its importance in achieving this vision by highly skilled rescue and relief operations, regular and intensive training and re-training, familiarization exercises within the area of responsibility of respective NDRF Battalions, carrying out mock drills and joint exercises with the various stakeholders.

Disaster Response 
NDRF has proved its efficacy with its commendable performance during various disasters including the drowning cases, building collapses, landslides, devastating floods and Cyclones. NDRF has saved  human lives and retrieved 2760 dead bodies of disaster victims in 73 response operations in the country. Some of the major response operations of NDRF as below:

2007
 Flood in Bhavnagar, Gujarat – 3–5 July 2007 – Rescued 291 people; distributed 3,750 food packets
 Flood in Rajkot, Gujarat – 3–5 July 2007 – Rescued 291 people; distributed 3,750 food packets
2008
 Building collapse (Hotel Shakunt) in Ahmedabad, Gujarat – 3–5 Feb 2008 – Saved 10 people and recovered 6 dead bodies
 Flood in Lakhimpur, Assam – 14 June – 20 July 2008 – Rescued 2500 civilians
 Flood in Dhemaji, Assam – 16 June – 31 July 2008 – Rescued 600 people
 Flood in Lakhimpur, Assam – 21 July – 4 August 2008 – Evacuated 2000 people

 Kosi breach in Bihar – 20 August 2008 – Saved over 105,000 people including women, children and the elderly; distributed medicines and water bottles
 Flood in Lakhimpur, Assam – 31 Aug – 9 September 2008 – Saved 750 people
 Flood in Puri, Cuttack, Kendrapara & Jagatsinghpur, Odisha – Sept 2008 – Saved over 1000 people
 Flood in Kamrup, Assam – 28 September 2008 – Saved 350 people
 Flood in Tiruvarur, Tamil Nadu – 26–30 Nov 2008 – Saved 773 people
 Flood in Chennai, Tamil Nadu – 26 Nov – 2 December 2008 – Rescued 1550 people
2009
 Cyclone Aila (24 Pargana North & South, West Bengal) – 25 May – 10 June 2009 – Rescued 2000 people; distribution of medicine to 30,000 victims & food packets to 16,000 homeless victims
 Flood in Barpeta, Assam – 27 May 2009 – Saved 300 people
 Flood in Junagarh and Porbandar, Gujarat – 16–29 July 2009 – Saved 2225 people
 Flood in Kasarkode, Kannur and Ernakulam, Kerala – 17–24 July 2009 – Saved 180 people
 Flood in Sitamarhi, Bihar (Bagmati breach) – 2–9 Aug 2009 – Rescued 1034 people; distributed medicines to 831 victims
 Flood in Howrah & Hooghly, West Bengal – 8–14 Sep 2009 – Rescue 675 people
 Andhra Pradesh & Karnataka Floods – Oct 2009 – Saved 10,659 people

2010
 Building collapse at Bellary, Karnataka – 27 January 2010 – Saved 20 human lives and recovered 27 dead bodies
 Flood in Guwahati, Assam – 20–25 April 2010 – Saved 300 human lives
 Cyclone Laila in Andhra Pradesh & Karnataka – 18 May 2010
2011

 46 members NDRF team performed search and rescue operation in Onagawa, Miyagi (Japan).

2013
Cyclone Phailin in the states of Andhra Pradesh, Odisha, etc. – The battalions of the army and navy were used to evacuate people.
2015
 NDRF rushed teams to parts of India and Nepal affected by a late April earthquake.
 Flood in Chennai, Tamil Nadu – 10 Nov

2019

 At least 58 teams of NDRF were deputed in Kerala during a flood in August 2018 making it the highest-ever deployment of NDRF in any single state since its raising. 194 persons have been rescued and more than 10,000 people have been evacuated so far. The NDRF teams are operational at present in Thrissur (15), Pathanamthitta (13), Alappuzha (11), Ernakulum (5), Idukki (4), Mallapuram (3), Wayanad and Kozhikode (2 each).

During the Kosi breach in Bihar in August 2008, which was declared a national calamity by Prime Minister Shri Manmohan Singh, NDRF personnel actively engaged themselves in rescue operations and relief duties in districts Supaul, Madhepura, Araria and Purnia. About 780 NDRF personnel trained in flood rescue operations along with 153 high capacity inflatable boats and other rescue equipment were deployed in the flood affected areas. The swift and highly skilled operations of NDRF saved more than 100,000 people trapped in swirling waters of river Kosi. NDRF personnel distributed relief supplies including drinking water to the stranded flood victims. Medical camps were also established to provide medical care to the flood affected people. Impressed with prompt and efficient response of NDRF, Chief Minister of Bihar Shri Nitish Kumar approached Prime Minister Shri Manmohan Singh for a NDRF Bn to be stationed in Bihar and offered  of land at Bihta near Patna.

NDRF commendable rescue operations were no less appreciated during the 2008 floods in Odisha, Maharashtra, Kerala and Assam.

On 25 May 2009 Cyclone Aila hit West Bengal coast with a fury unprecedented in recent history. It took at least 94 lives, seven of them in Kolkata, and affected over 4 million people. More than six lakh houses were destroyed completely or damaged partially. NDRF promptly responded to the devastating situation and 600 personnel of NDRF with 84 boats and other rescue equipment started rescue and relief operations at cyclone affected areas of district 24 Pargana North and South of West Bengal. During the operations NDRF personnel rescued around 2000 trapped persons and distributed 50 truckloads of relief materials to the affected people.

On 1 October 2009 in the wake of worsening flood situations in the States of Andhra Pradesh and Karnataka, the State Government of both the states sent their requests for deployment of National Disaster Response Force (NDRF) for rescue and relief operations. NDMA mobilised 963 flood rescue trained personnel (including some deep divers) and 308 inflatable motorised boats from 05 NDRF Bns located at Arakkonam (Chennai), Pune, Mundali (Odisha), Greater Noida and Bhatinda and airlifted on 2–3 Oct 2009 in Air Force IL-76 and AN-32 aircraft from nearest Air Force bases and Civil Airports. The rescue personnel deployed in 04 districts of Andhra Pradesh (Kurnool, Vijayawada, Mehboob Nagar and Nandhiyal) and 04 districts of Karnataka (Bagalkote, Raichur, Gadag and Vijaypur) and immediately started rescue and relief operations in the flood affected districts of both the states.

NDRF rescued tens of thousands of persons marooned in the floods at these two States and distributed over 40 quintals of food and drinking water. The medical teams of NDRF at these districts administering medical first response and distributing medicines to the flood victims.

On 26 January 2010 a five-storied under-construction residential building collapsed at Bellary, Karnataka with about 50 people trapped under the huge debris. 3 rescue teams (102 personnel) of NDRF Bn Pune promptly airlifted to Bellary and NDRF personnel carried out round the clock operation with the help of search & rescue equipment and dogs for 09 days. In the meticulously carried out operation under huge debris the NDRF managed to rescue 20 live persons. The last person was rescued on the 9th day. NDRF also retrieved 27 dead bodies trapped under debris. rescue operations in Kerala(2018)

2020

 Gas leak in Visakhapatnam, Andhra Pradesh – 7 May 2020
 Cyclone  Amphan in West Bengal

2021
 Glacial outburst flood in Uttarakhand – 7 February 2021
Cyclone Yaas in Odisha and West Bengal

Training 

In the future, the key to efficient disaster response will depend primarily on the effectiveness of the training and re-training of Specialized Disaster Response Forces. With this vision, a detailed "Training Regime for Disaster Response" has been prepared by NDMA/NDRF identifying the specific disaster response training courses and devising a unified, structured and uniform course module as well as a syllabus for these training courses. The proposition behind a unified, structured, uniform course module and syllabus is that first the entire NDRF battalions will successfully attain these courses and subsequently the State Disaster Response Forces (SDRF) and other stakeholders will be trained on the same lines. The need for a uniformly structured course module emerged from the fact that if all the NDRF battalions and other ‘first responders’ undergo the same training exercise, the coordination between different stakeholders would be expedient and well planned at the time of any major disaster where different NDRF battalions, SDRF battalions and other stakeholders will be working together in close coordination with each other.

After its constitution in 2005, NDRF with its swift and highly skilled rescue operations has emerged as most visible and vibrant force of the NDMA. NDRF personnel are invariably trained in courses like Flood Rescue, Collapsed Structure Search and Rescue, Medical First Responders, Rope rescue, Nuclear, Biological and Chemical Emergencies; Dignified Disposal of Dead Bodies etc. NDRF personnel are trained in prestigious institutes like NISA, DRDO, BARC, CME, Army, Navy and Air Force as well in foreign countries like US, Singapore, China, Finland, Korea, Switzerland etc.

Training abroad
 INSARAG Asia-Pacific Exercise, China, 4–7 August 2006
 OPCW Chemical Emergency Course, Finland, 21–25 August 2006
 UNDAC Induction Course, Korea, 17–29 Sep 2006
 INSARAG Asia-Pacific Exercise, Mongolia, 31 July – 2 August 2007
 UNDAC Induction Course, Malaysia, 10–14 July 2007
 INSARAG Meeting, Korea, 3–6 Oct 2007
 UNDAC Induction Course, New Zealand, 14–16 Oct 2007
 INSARAG Asia-Pacific Exercise, Switzerland, 17–20 Nov 2008
 Management of Dead Bodies, Geneva, Switzerland, 4–8 Feb 2008
 Singapore Civil Defence Academy, Singapore, 10–27 March 2008
 INSARAG Asia-Pacific Exercise, Philippines, 15–17 April 2008
 APCSS, Honolulu, Hawaii, US, 29 May – 27 June 2008
 Advanced Search & Rescue Course, Florida, US, 1–5 Sep 2008
 Chemical Exercise, OPCW, Tehran, Iran, 1–5 Nov 2008
 INSARAG Asia-Pacific Exercise, Nepal, 21–24 April 2009
 APCSS, Honolulu, Hawaii, US, 20 Aug – 22 September 2009
 Bio-terrorism Table top Exercise, Montreux, Switzerland, 7–8 Sep 2009

Training of NDRF

While the NDRF is being trained, re-trained and equipped as a specialist force for level three disasters, it is equally important to ensure capacity building of state police personnel who are invariably the first responders in any natural or man-made disasters. To ensure this, a two-pronged strategy is being suggested to the states: firstly, to train state police personnel in the basics of disaster management and secondly, to train at least one battalion equivalent out of their state armed police units as State Disaster Response Force (SDRF) on lines of the NDRF. In addition to police personnel, the SDRFs may be constituted from existing resources of the Fire Services, Home Guards and Civil Defence. NDRF Bns and their training institutions will assist the States/UTs in this effort. The State/UTs will also be encouraged to set up DM training facilities in their respective Police Training Colleges and include this subject in their basic and in-service courses.

205 police personnel from 21 states of the country have been trained.

Training being one of the most important attributes for an efficient force, the Government of India has recognised the recommendations of the NDMA for setting up an apex National Institute of Excellence for Search and Rescue at a central place like Nagpur to provide training of trainers and to meet other national and international commitments. Also a network of 10 outreach centres at the respective NDRF Bns locations are proposed to be set up.

Community-based disaster preparedness 

Awareness and preparedness campaigns are key components of proactive approach on disaster management. In case of any disaster, the local population is the actual first responder. It may take some time for the district or state administration to mobilise rescue teams, including police and fire personnel. If the local people is properly sensitised about the precautions and preventive actions to be taken in case of any calamity, the loss of life and damage to property can be drastically reduced. Thus, one of the most important tasks of NDRF is to continuously engage themselves in the community capacity building and public awareness programmes, which includes training of people (the first-responders) and concerned government officials at different levels in the areas with high vulnerability. Along with community capacity building and public awareness exercises, NDRF is also actively engaged in area familiarisation exercises. Such exercises provide first-hand knowledge about the topography, access route to various disaster-prone areas, and the availability of local infrastructure/logistics which can be used in disaster response operations.

Year-wise number of community volunteers trained by NDRF ARE AS FOLLOW:-

A pilot project on community capacity building and public awareness campaigns on floods, earthquakes and other natural disasters was organised by NDRF teams during June–July 2007 in 14 high vulnerable districts (Araria, Saharsa, Kishanganj, Madhepura, Supaul, Khagaria, Begusarai, Darbhanga, Madhubani, Munger, Patna, Muzaffarpur, Sitamarhi and Samastipur) of Bihar. In this project, 2200 volunteers and State Disaster Management Authority (SDMA) officials were trained by the NDRF. This capacity building programme was continued next year also.

State-wise numbers of community volunteers trained by NDRF

In 2008, NDRF embarked in a big way on community capacity building and public awareness programmes in Bihar, which included training of vulnerable people and officials in various districts. NDRF carried out three-day flood preparedness training programmes for a month in 15 vulnerable districts (Bhagalpur, East Champaran, Vaishali, Munger, Muzaffarpur, Saharsa, Madhepura, Khagaria, Begusarai, Darbhanga, Madhubani, Patna, Sitamarhi, Samastipur and Sheohar) of Bihar before monsoon season at district/Block levels. More than 15,000 village volunteers, local people, students, State Police, and also Central and State Government personnel participated in the programme.

NDRF also conducts regular mock exercises on various disasters like cyclone, flood, earthquake, NBC emergencies, mass casualty management etc. Participation in such exercises on the one hand improve the professionalism of NDRF personnel to tackle the real emergency situations and on the other provides an opportunity to interact with various State Government officials and to develop cordial relations with them that can be of great help during response to actual disasters.

As of 31 March 2010, NDRF had trained more than 650,000 community volunteers throughout the country.

Workshops and exhibitions 

NDRF Bn Pune put up an exhibition of International standard at TechFest 2010 (the annual International Science and Technology Festival of IIT Mumbai) and organised demonstrations on Heli-Rescue, Collapsed Structure Search & Rescue, High-Rise Building Rescue and Dog Show between 22 and 24 January 2010 aimed at generate awareness among the visitors.
TechFest 2010 was inaugurated by Gen N. C. Vij, Honourable vice-chairman, NDMA. This three-day event witnessed more than 70,000 visitors, 15,000 participants, nearly 2000 colleges and approximately 5000 members of Industry and academia. The exhibition and demonstrations of NDRF were highly appreciated by the visitors.

Some of the important exhibitions organised by NDRF are as below:

2007	
 UNOCHA, Annual USAR Team Leaders Meeting – 13–15 March 2007
 2nd Asian Ministerial Conference on Disaster Risk Reduction – Nov 2007

2008
 Workshop on ‘Disaster Risk Management’ at Itanagar, Arunachal Pradesh – 17–18 April 2008
 Workshop on ‘Disaster Preparedness’ at Shillong, Meghalaya – 10–11 June 2008
 Workshop on ‘Disaster Risk Reduction’ at Agartala, Tripura – 12–13 Dec 2008
 Exhibition on Disaster Management, Army Training Command at Bhubaneswar, Odisha – 13–14 Dec 2008

2009
 A workshop cum exhibition on Disaster Management, University of Pune, Maharashtra – 12–13 Jan 2009
 Workshop on ‘Disaster Risk Reduction’ at Aizawl, Mizoram – 11–12 June 2009

2010
 TechFest 2010 (The annual International Science and Technology Festival of IIT Mumbai) – 22–24 Jan 2010
 Technika 2010, the annual technical festival of Birla Institute of Technology, Mesra − 26 March 2010
 Exhibition on Disaster Awareness, Bihar Divas at Gandhi Maidan, Patna – 22–24 March 2010
 Participation in TATPAR 2010 (Mega-Exhibition on disaster management organised by Disaster Management Department of Municipal Corporation of Greater Mumbai) at Shivaji Park, Mumbai – 26–27 Feb 2010. We salute NDRF.

See also 
 Indian Armed Forces
 Central Armed Police Forces
 State Disaster Response Force Assam

References

External links 

 
National Disaster Management Authority, Government of India, website

2006 establishments in India
Emergency services in India
Natural disasters in India
Ministry of Home Affairs (India)
Government agencies of India
Government agencies established in 2006
Disaster Response Forces in India